HPFS may refer to:

 High Performance File System, a computer file system for OS/2
 High Point Friends School, a school in North Carolina, US

See also
 Hi Performance FileSystem (HFS), a computer file system for HP-UX
 HPF (disambiguation)